In Greek mythology, Aenus (Ancient Greek: Αἶνον) a Ceteian soldier who participated in the Trojan War. During the siege of Troy, he was slain by Odysseus using his spear along with Polydorus, another Ceteian. His name means 'dread, dire, grim, horrible' or 'tale, story'.

Note

References 

 Quintus Smyrnaeus, The Fall of Troy translated by Way. A. S. Loeb Classical Library Volume 19. London: William Heinemann, 1913. Online version at theio.com
 Quintus Smyrnaeus, The Fall of Troy. Arthur S. Way. London: William Heinemann; New York: G.P. Putnam's Sons. 1913. Greek text available at the Perseus Digital Library.

Characters in Greek mythology